Immediate Media Company Limited (styled as Immediate Media Co) is a British multinational publishing house that currently publishes a significant range of titles, including Radio Times, BBC Top Gear, BBC Good Food and a host of others. In H1 2018, the company's titles reported a combined ABC circulation of 1.59 million, including 1.1M active subscribers. In 2018 it reported selling 70+ million magazines.

The publishing house is owned by Hubert Burda Media, and is an agglomeration of Magicalia, Origin Publishing and BBC Magazines, publishing both media content and software platforms. Approximately 85% of its revenue is from content services, with the remainder from advertising.

History 
Immediate Media originated from the combined assets of several formerly independent publishing houses, including BBC Magazines, Magicalia, Future plc, Hitched and Jewellery Maker.

In late 2011 the BBC's magazine-publishing business was sold to Exponent Private Equity, following clearance by the Office of Fair Trading. Exponent had previously acquired Magicalia Limited, a digital publisher and platform provider based in London. Magicalia was founded in 1999 by Adam Laird and Jeremy Tapp. Its inaugural website was bikemagic.com. In 2000, it began offering B2B publishing services, with clients such as Runner's World magazine.

In 2011 Magicalia's assets were combined with those of Origin Publishing and BBC Magazines to form Immediate. Tom Bureau, then-CEO of Magicalia, became the Chief Executive of the new company.

In May 2014 Immediate acquired Future plc's sport and craft titles. The sport portfolio included the websites Bikeradar.com and Cyclingnews.com and the magazines Cycling Plus, Procycling and Mountain Biking UK. The craft titles included Love Patchwork and Quilting, Simply Knitting, and Mollie Makes. In January 2015, Immediate acquired Hitched.co.uk, a UK wedding planning brand. In November 2015 Immediate acquired its first television property, Jewellery Maker, a TV and online commerce platform, from the Genuine Gemstone Company, adding to its Crafts and Arts portfolio. Jewellery Maker employed over 100 people at the time of its acquisition. It has since expanded into TV, video and e-commerce.

Hubert Burda Media acquired Immediate in 2017, for £270 million (5-6 x EBITDA).

In 2019, Immediate sold Procycling magazine and the Cyclingnews.com website to Future plc.

Divisions

TV and Entertainment 
Radio Times is a British weekly television and radio programme listings magazine, founded in 1923 by John Reith, the then general manager of the BBC. It was the world's first broadcast listings magazine. The title was published entirely in-house by BBC Magazines from 1937 until 2011, when the BBC Magazines division was sold to Immediate. Its peak weekly circulation was 8.8 million. In 2014 it accounted for 60% of Immediate's profit. It is the UK's biggest-selling magazine, with a weekly print ABC of 577,087, and the UK's biggest weekly subscription title, with 271,237 subscribers in 2018.

Sport 

220 Triathlon
BikeRadar
Cycling Plus
Mountain Biking UK
Outdoors Magic
Urban Cyclist
What Mountain Bike

Homes and Gardening 
BBC Gardeners' World
Gardens Illustrated
Antiques Roadshow
Homes & Antiques
The Recommended

Crafts 

 Cardmaking & Papercraft
 Cross Stitch Crazy
 Cross Stitch Gold
 Get into Craft
 Jewellery Maker
 Love Crochet
 Love Knitting
 Love Patchwork & Quilting
 Mollie Makes
 Papercraft Inspirations
 Quick Cards Made Easy
 Sewing Quarter
 Simply Crochet
 Simply Knitting
 Simply Sewing
 The Knitter
 The World of Cross Stitching
 The Yarn Loop
 Today's Quilter
 Ultimate Cross Stitch
 We Love Craft

Motoring 
BBC Top Gear

Parents and children 
Immediate says that it has the largest market share in the UK children's magazines sector, with a total ABC-audited circulation of 780,194.

 Giggly.co.uk
 Junior
 Made For Mums

Weddings 
 Hitched.co.uk
 Perfect Wedding
 You & Your Wedding

Specialist 
 BBC Easy Cook
 BBC Countryfile
 BBC Good Food
 BBC History
 BBC Match of the Day
 BBC Music
 BBC Science Focus
 BBC Sky at Night Magazine
 BBC Wildlife
 Delicious
 Healthy Food Guide
 History Extra
 History Revealed
 Homes and 
 Planet Traveller
 Olive
 Science and Nature
 Top of the Pops

Youth and Children 
 Andy's Amazing Adventures
 Art-Draw and Create
 Baby Shark
 BBC CBeebies
 BBC CBeebies ART
 BBC CBeebies Special
 BBC Match of the Day Magazine
 BBC Match of the Day Specials
 BBC Top of the Pops Magazine
 Disney Frozen
 Disney Frozen Fun Time
 Disney Stars
 Disney Princess Create and Collect
 Girl Talk
 Hatchimals
 Lego Ninjago
 Lego Disney Princesses
 Lego Superhero Legends
 Lego Star Wars
 Lego Specials
 Lego Giant Series
 Lego City
 MEGA!
 PJ Masks
 Pokémon
 Ultimate Series

Platforms and other revenue 
Some Immediate brands serve as e-commerce marketplaces. These include the wedding site hitched.co.uk and the TV shopping arm of Jewellery Maker. In July 2022, Immediate launched The Recommended, an internet shopping guide devoted to e-commerce recommendations and buyers' guides. Immediate also organises live events such as the Radio Times Festival.

Immediate sells market research services based around its consumer panel, which the company says has 14,000 respondents. The firm also provides data analytics, loyalty publishing and IP licensing.

References 

 https://flashesandflames.com/2018/12/14/uks-immediate-brings-growth-back-to-magazines/

External links 
Immediate Media Company

Publishing companies of England
Publishing companies based in London
BBC publications
Mass media in London
Companies established in 2011